Randy Marsh and Sharon Marsh (née Kimble) are fictional characters in the animated television series South Park. They are the most prominent set of parents on the show and a middle-class married couple who raise their 10-year-old son Stan and 13-year-old daughter Shelley in the fictional town of South Park, Colorado. Their first names are derived from the first names of series co-creator Trey Parker's parents, and Parker describes Randy as "the biggest dingbat in the entire show". According to the season 16 episode "Reverse Cowgirl", the Marsh home address was 260 Avenue de los Mexicanos until their move to a farm.

In tradition with the show's animation style, Randy and Sharon are both composed of simple geometrical shapes, animated with the use of a computer, and rendered to mimic the appearance of construction paper cutout compositions animated through the use of stop motion, which was the technique used to animate the "Spirit of Christmas" shorts and the show's first episode. Randy is voiced by Parker, while Sharon was originally voiced by Mary Kay Bergman, then by Eliza Schneider, and currently by April Stewart.

Randy, in particular, has received critical acclaim from critics, and is often cited as the series' breakout character. This led him to become the protagonist of South Park'''s 23rd season, as the show focused on his work at the Tegridy Farms instead of the town of South Park and its elementary school. Stan, as well as the other original main characters Kyle Broflovski, Eric Cartman, and Kenny McCormick became supporting characters. Randy is also responsible for the ongoing COVID-19 pandemic after Mickey Mouse encouraged him to have sexual intercourse with a bat and a pangolin while he was sick during his trip in China ("Band in China").

Characters
Randy and Sharon have known each other since childhood. Taking liberties with its floating timeline, the show establishes Randy and Sharon as being young adults during the flower power era. They maintain steady friendships with the parents of Stan's friends, and are revealed as enjoying the act of watching pornography together to enhance their sexual relationship. However, their marriage has not been without its frequent arguments, which are usually instigated when Sharon is annoyed, ashamed, or disgusted by Randy's eccentricities. The two briefly divorced on two occasions, but quickly reconciled each time. Randy and Sharon tend to showcase liberal viewpoints, having protested the 2003 invasion of Iraq and supported Barack Obama during the 2008 presidential race.

Randy
Randy has black hair, a mustache, and a cleft chin. He carries a few pens in one of the two front pockets on his light blue, collared, button-up shirt, and wears dark gray pants. White briefs are his underpants of choice. He is 45 years old, and like Parker's father, is a geologist, making his first appearance in the series while monitoring a seismometer in the episode "Volcano". He was depicted to work at the South Park Center for Seismic Activity, and was later shown to work for the U. S. Geological Survey. He was briefly fired from his geologist job near the end of the 12th season, and quit briefly during the end of the 14th season, but has since been rehired both times. Randy has not been shown at the earthquake monitoring office since he opened Tegridy Farms, and in-show events strongly suggest that he has abandoned his previous career to raise marijuana full-time. He also serves on the city council, specializing in the town's parks and public grounds.

A recurring character trait of Randy's is his being prone to overreacting and obsessively seizing upon irrational ideas and fads, whether by himself or as part of a large contingent of the town's adult population. He frequently attempts to appear cool and popular, particularly to Stan, who finds his attempts embarrassing unless they benefit Stan's interests in some way.

Among the endeavors on which he sometimes embarks are get-rich quick schemes or other strategies for economic or material gain. In "Something Wall-Mart This Way Comes", he took a job as an associate at Wal-Mart. In "A Nightmare on Face Time", he buys the closed Blockbuster Video in town, hoping to turn it around. In "Black Friday", he takes a job as a security guard at the town's shopping mall during the Black Friday to infiltrate the mall before the stampede of shoppers. In later seasons, Randy is shown to have finally achieved a very high income from both his work as Lorde and his marijuana business, though this has not improved the underlying problems in his family relationships.

Randy dropped out of high school and was a member of a boyband in his teens, as shown in "Something You Can Do with Your Finger", but he has mentioned that he attended college and has been indicated to hold a doctorate.

The show frequently depicts him to be a moderate to heavy drinker, and numerous episodes have dealt with Randy's belligerent and negligent behavior brought upon by his severe intoxication.

A few instances of personal achievement have made Randy a hero in the eyes of his friends and fellow townsfolk, such as being awarded a Nobel Prize and twice setting a record for producing the world's largest piece of human excrement. Randy has conversely been subjected to ridicule from the entire town, ranging from when he inadvertently accelerated the effects of global warming by suggesting the entire populace take on a more uninhibited approach to passing gas to avoid the hazard of spontaneous combustion to when he reluctantly exclaimed "niggers" while attempting to solve a puzzle during a live broadcast of Wheel of Fortune. In addition to the professional singing he did in his youth, Randy can also play guitar, as seen in "Guitar Queer-O". He can also speak a little Mongolian, having learned some in college, as seen in the episode "Child Abduction Is Not Funny".

The episode "Gluten Free Ebola" revealed that Randy produces music and performs as the noted musician Lorde, a fact that was explored subsequently in "The Cissy". This has become a running gag that has continued through multiple episodes, such as suggesting much of the Marsh family's income comes from his music career as Lorde rather than his geology job. As of season 22, Randy quit his job and moved the family to the countryside, where he sets up Tegridy Farms to grow and distribute cannabis. Throughout Season 23, Randy engages in increasingly unethical business practices until he is sent to prison in "Season Finale"; though he is eventually released, he vows to no longer engage in illegal activities, though the cannabis season ends shortly after his release. In "Christmas Snow", he begins selling cocaine during the winter, which he has legalized in multiple states so that he can farm it.

Randy also makes a cameo appearance in the 2022 film Chip 'n Dale: Rescue Rangers.

Sharon
Sharon is a 42-year-old receptionist. Sharon has never been portrayed in a work capacity on the series, but was depicted as the receptionist at Tom's Rhinoplasty, a local surgical clinic, in South Park: Bigger, Longer & Uncut and South Park: The Stick of Truth''. She has close-cropped brown hair, and wears a brown long-sleeved pullover adorned with red ruffles at the cuffs and collar, and dark blue pants. She is referred to by the name 'Carol' in the episode 'Death' when Sheila Broflovski hands her the phone at the protest with Cartoon Central.

Family
Randy and Sharon are the parents of two children: 10-year-old son Stan and 13-year-old daughter Shelley. Randy is generally a doting, well-meaning father to Stan, though their relationship has become strained in the several instances when Randy's irrational behavior and periodic alcoholism aggravate his son. As a result, Stan is usually led to question his father's intelligence. Randy has also taken an interest in learning how to play the same computer and video games Stan enjoys. Though Randy is often shown as being more fanatical in their upbringing efforts, Sharon has also been represented as an overzealous parent, such as when she kidnaps Officer Barbrady after he comes to investigate the disappearance of those Sharon had buried in her yard because she mistakenly thought they were Stan's murder victims. Randy has a habit of temporarily favoring alternatives to Catholicism and imposing his new beliefs on his family. He easily persuaded Sharon to become an atheist, but was less successful in getting his entire family enthused about converting to Mormonism. Although not shy about explaining puberty to Stan, both Randy and Sharon are uncomfortable with the idea of having to talk with their son about sex and drugs. The relationship between the couple and their daughter Shelley has yet to receive significant attention on the show, although the episode "An Elephant Makes Love to a Pig" depicts them as taking Shelley's word over Stan's, at least at first.

Jimbo Kern had been portrayed as being both Sharon's and Randy's brother during the show's run, but an interview with series cocreator Matt Stone established him as being Randy's half-brother. According to 2020's "Pandemic Special", however, Jimbo is indeed Sharon's brother. As is the case with Shelley, whatever relationship either might have with Jimbo has not been the subject of any of the show's subplots. A similar situation exists with Marvin Marsh, a 102-year-old who lives with Randy and Sharon. Though he shares the same family name as Randy, both Randy and Sharon have acknowledged Marvin as their own father. The episode "Spookyfish" briefly featured Aunt Flo, an elderly aunt of Sharon's who is the personification of a woman's period.

References

South Park characters
Animated duos
Comedy film characters
Fictional characters from Colorado
Fictional cannabis users
Fictional farmers
Fictional geologists
Fictional Democrats (United States)
Fictional married couples
Television characters introduced in 1997
Animated characters introduced in 1997

hu:Randy Marsh
ru:Шерон Марш
ru:Рэнди Марш